The 2014 Derby City Classic  was a professional pool tournament and the 16th Edition of the Derby City Classic.  It took place from January 24 to February 1, 2014 in Horseshoe Southern Indiana  in  Elizabeth,  Indiana. Competitions were held in the disciplines nine-ball, ten-ball, one-pocket, straight, and bank pool. The Master of the Table awarded for the best player overall was won by Dennis Orcollo.

Results

Nine-ball 
The nine-ball competition took place from January 29 to February 1. With a total prize money of over $64,000, of which the winner received $16,000, was the most highest prize fund for any competition in the Derby City Classic. The ranking of the 45 best-placed players is given below.

References

External links 
 Official website (archive)

 Derby City Classic 2014 at sixpockets.de
 
2014 in cue sports
Derby City Classic